The 1982 Avon Championships of Detroit  was a women's tennis tournament played on indoor carpet courts at the Cobo Hall & Arena  in Detroit, Michigan in the United States that was part of the 1982 Avon Championships circuit. This was the 11th edition of the tournament and was held from February 1 through February 7, 1982. First-seeded Andrea Jaeger won the singles title and earned $30,000 in first-prize money.

Finals

Singles
 Andrea Jaeger defeated  Mima Jaušovec 2–6, 6–4, 6–2

Doubles
 Leslie Allen /  Mima Jaušovec defeated  Rosemary Casals /  Wendy Turnbull 6–4, 6–0

Prize money

References

External links
 International Tennis Federation (ITF) tournament edition details

Avon Championships of Detroit
Virginia Slims of Detroit
1982 in sports in Michigan
February 1982 sports events in the United States